Jamirghata railway station is a railway station on the Howrah–New Jalpaiguri line of Malda railway division of Eastern Railway zone. It is situated beside National Highway 34 at Pratappur, Sujapur, Jamirghata of Malda district in the Indian state of West Bengal. Total 8 passenger trains stop at Jamirghata railway station.

References

Railway stations in Malda district
Malda railway division